Mr. Duke is a 2000 South Korean television series by MBC about an heiress who hires a poor man who becomes her husband.

Plot
Soo-jin Jang's rich and powerful father tricks her into returning to Korea so that she can be married and provide him with a successor to his business empire. Desperate to stop her father's madness, Soo-jin pretends she already has a boyfriend, and so enlists the help of simple water deliveryman, Kim Yong-nam (Kim Seung-woo). She must pass Yong-nam off as a member of high society if she is to stop her father's plans.

Cast
Kim Seung-woo as Kim Yong-nam
Choi Ji-woo as Jang Soo-jin
Myung Kye-nam as Myung Gi-nam
Kim Byung-se as Kang Sung-il
Choi Jung-yoon as Joo Eun-ha
Lee Soon-jae as President Jang
Hong Kyung-in as Baek Kwang-soo
Lee Kye-in as Department head Jo 
Park Yeong-gyu as Jang Soo-chul
Choi Ran as Park Ae-ja
Na Moon-hee
Kim Chang-wan
Kim Dong-hyun as a pizza delivery guy

See also
List of Korean television shows
Contemporary culture of South Korea

References

External links
  , MBC Guide, July 2000
  SPCNet Review

MBC TV television dramas
2000 South Korean television series debuts
2000 South Korean television series endings
Korean-language television shows
South Korean romantic comedy television series